The 1878–79 United States Senate elections were held on various dates in various states. As these U.S. Senate elections were prior to the ratification of the Seventeenth Amendment in 1913, senators were chosen by state legislatures. Senators were elected over a wide range of time throughout 1878 and 1879, and a seat may have been filled months late or remained vacant due to legislative deadlock. In these elections, terms were up for the senators in Class 3.

The Democratic Party re-captured control of the Senate for the first time since before the Civil War.

Results summary 
Senate party division, 46th Congress (1879–1881)
 Majority party: Democratic (42)
 Minority party: Republican (31)
 Other parties: Independent (1), Anti-Monopoly (1)
 Total seats: 76

Change in composition

Before the elections

After the elections

Race summaries

Special elections during the 45th Congress 
In these elections, the winners were seated in 1879 before March 4; ordered by election date.

Races leading to the 46th Congress 

In these regular elections, the winners were elected for the term beginning March 4, 1885; ordered by state.

All of the elections involved the Class 3 seats.

Elections during the 46th Congress 
In this election, the winner was elected in 1879 after March 4.

Maryland 

James Black Groome was elected by a margin of 60.22%, or 56 votes, for the Class 3 seat.

New York 

In New York, the election was held on January 21, 1879, by the New York State Legislature. Republican Roscoe Conkling had been re-elected in January 1873 to this seat, and his term would expire on March 3, 1879.  At the State election in November 1877, 19 Republicans and 13 Democrats were elected for a two-year term (1878-1879) in the State Senate. At the State election in November 1878, 97 Republicans, 28 Democrats and 3 Greenbackers were elected for the session of 1879 to the Assembly, and Republican Thomas Murphy was elected to fill the vacancy in the State Senate caused by the death of Democrat John Morrissey. The 102nd New York State Legislature met from January 7 to May 22, 1879, at Albany, New York.

The caucus of Republican State legislators met on January 20, Temporary President of the State Senate William H. Robertson presided. Present were all Republican legislators except State Senator Louis S. Goebel (6th D.) and Assemblyman James W. Wadsworth. They re-nominated the incumbent U.S. Senator Conkling unanimously.  The caucus of the Democratic State legislators met also on January 20. State Senator Thomas C. E. Ecclesine (8th D.) offered to adopt a prostest against the senatorial election proceedings, claiming that the senatorial and assembly districts were incorrectly apportioned and thus the State Legislature did not represent the wish of the people of the State. The protest was substituted by a resolution to appoint a committee which would elaborate an address on the apportionment at a later date. Ecclesine then marched out, and the remaining legislators nominated Lieutenant Governor William Dorsheimer for the U.S. Senate.

The two Greenback assemblymen John Banfield (Chemung Co.) and George E. Williams (Oswego Co.) voted for 87-year-old Peter Cooper, a New York City inventor, industrialist and philanthropist who had run for U.S. President in 1876 on the Greenback ticket.

Roscoe Conkling was the choice of both the Assembly and the State Senate, and was declared elected.

Note: The votes were cast on January 21, but both Houses met in a joint session on January 22 to compare nominations, and declare the result.

Pennsylvania 

In Pennsylvania, the election was held January 20, 1879. J. Donald Cameron was re-elected by the Pennsylvania General Assembly to the United States Senate.

After Sen. Simon Cameron resigned from office, his son J. Donald Cameron was elected by the General Assembly, consisting of the House of Representatives and the Senate, in 1877 to serve the remainder of the unexpired term, which was to expire on March 4, 1879.  The Pennsylvania General Assembly convened on January 20, 1879, to elect a Senator to serve the term beginning on March 4, 1879. The results of the vote of both houses combined are as follows:

|-
|-bgcolor="#EEEEEE"
| colspan="3" align="right" | Totals
| align="right" | 251
| align="right" | 100.00%
|}

See also 
 1878 United States elections
 1878–79 United States House of Representatives elections
 45th United States Congress
 46th United States Congress

Notes

References

Further reading 
 
 
 Party Division in the Senate, 1789-Present, via Senate.gov
 , gives 1 Greenbacker elected, but Williams of Oswego is not in the list; this seems to have been a preliminary result which was later amended